The Illinois–Indiana–Iowa League was a Minor League Baseball organization that operated for the better part of 60 seasons, with teams based in Illinois, Indiana, Iowa, Kansas, Minnesota, Missouri, Nebraska and Wisconsin. The league began play in 1901 and disbanded after the 1961 season. It was popularly known as the Three–I League and sometimes as the Three–Eye League.

The Illinois–Indiana–Iowa League played from 1901 to 1961 with some interruptions due to world events: the league did not play in 1918 due to World War I and it had a break in 1933 and 1934 because of the Great Depression. After resuming play in 1935, it closed down in 1936, but reformed and had a six-year run from 1937 through 1942, before a break due to World War II. The league resumed play in 1946, lasting through 1961, where it was largely supplanted by the Midwest League. A Class B level league from 1902 throughout its lifespan, no other league survived for as long at that level.

History
The Illinois–Indiana–Iowa League was founded in 1901 with Rock Island, Illinois native Michael H. Sexton serving as the first president. Eight charter members began play in 1901. The Bloomington Blues, Cedar Rapids Rabbitts, Davenport River Rats, Decatur Commodores, Evansville River Rats, Rock Island Islanders, Rockford Red Sox and Terre Haute Hottentots were the charter teams. Bloomington, Illinois, Decatur, Illinois and Terre Haute, Indiana had left the Central League to join expansion teams in Cedar Rapids, Iowa, Davenport, Iowa, Evansville, Indiana, Rockford, Illinois, and Rock Island, Illinois and form the Class D level league. Two expansion teams, Davenport and Evansville, chose  "River Rats" as their team name.

For the second season, 1902, the league became Class B level league, a classification it retained for the next 59 seasons of league operation.

The Illinois–Indiana–Iowa League was inactive during some years of World War I (1918), the Great Depression (1933–1934, 1936) and World War II (1943–1945), similar to many minor leagues that were forced to suspend operations or disband during those severe times.

As with many minor leagues, especially at the lower classifications, league membership fluctuated a great deal over its six decades. Overall, the league hosted teams in 31 cities during its existence. At various times it had teams in such medium-sized cities as Cedar Rapids, Davenport, Bloomington, Decatur, Danville, Peoria, Springfield, Evansville and Terre Haute. It was a Class B league in the old classification system that ran from Class D up to Class Triple-A.

The 1955 Keokuk Kernels are ranked #30 in the Top–100 All–Time minor league teams by MiLB.com. The Kernels finished with a 92–34 record and were led by Russ Nixon and Mudcat Grant.

Since 1956 its territory had largely been supplanted by the Midwest League, which began play in 1947 as the Class D level Illinois State League. After 1956 there were no Illinois or Indiana teams in the league. The final 1961 Illinois–Indiana–Iowa League franchises were the Fox Cities Foxes, Burlington Bees, Topeka Reds, Lincoln Chiefs, Cedar Rapids Braves and Des Moines Demons. In 1962, Appleton (Fox Cities), Burlington, and Cedar Rapids joined the Midwest League and the Illinois–Indiana–Iowa League folded operations when those franchises switched leagues.

The league's unique name made it a convenient reference point for any mention of the minor leagues. Casey Stengel made the following comment in later life, evidently still feeling stung from having been traded by the New York Giants to the Boston Braves in the 1923–1924 off-season, despite having hit 2 game-winning home runs in the World Series:  "It's lucky I didn't hit 3 home runs in three games, or McGraw would have traded me to the 3-I League!"

Illinois–Indiana–Iowa League teams (1901–1961)

Year-by-year (1901–1932)
1901 Illinois–Indiana–Iowa League
Terre Haute won the title behind the impressive pitching of Mordecai Brown, future Chicago Cubs mound star.

1902 Illinois–Indiana–Iowa League

1903 Illinois–Indiana–Iowa League
Evansville and Terre Haute joined the Central League.  New teams in Dubuque, Iowa and Joliet, Illinois formed. Joliet, with a record of 14–19, moved to Springfield, Illinois on June 12, where they had a record of 28–61.

1904 Illinois–Indiana–Iowa League

1905 Illinois–Indiana–Iowa League
The Rockford team folded, and a new team in Peoria, Illinois formed.

After the season ended, Cedar Rapids lost to the Burlington, Iowa team from the Iowa State League 4 games to 3.

1906 Illinois–Indiana–Iowa League

1907 Illinois–Indiana–Iowa League
The Davenport team folded.  The team from Clinton, Iowa joined after leaving the Iowa State League.

1908 Illinois–Indiana–Iowa League

1909 Illinois–Indiana–Iowa League
The Clinton team folded.  A new team in Davenport, Iowa formed.

1910 Illinois–Indiana–Iowa League
After the previous disappointing season, Cedar Rapids folded.  The Decatur team moved to the Northern Association.  The team from Waterloo, Iowa left the Central Association to join here.  A new team from Danville, Illinois formed and joined the league as well.

1911 Illinois–Indiana–Iowa League
The team from Bloomington folded.  The Quincy, Illinois team from the Central Association joined the league.  The Springfield team, with a 12–4 record, moved to Decatur, Illinois on May 31, where their record was 57–56.

1912 Illinois–Indiana–Iowa League
The teams from Rock Island and Waterloo folded.  New teams from Springfield, Illinois and Bloomington, Indiana joined the league.

1913 Illinois–Indiana–Iowa League

1914 Illinois–Indiana–Iowa League
The Danville team, with a record of 26–53, moved to Moline, Illinois on July 14, where their record was 20–33.

1915 Illinois–Indiana–Iowa League
The Springfield team folded.  A new team in Rockford, Illinois formed.  Dubuque moved to Freeport, Illinois during the season.  The Decatur team folded on August 10.  The league adopted a playoff system in which the team with the best record in the first half of the season would play the team with the best record in the second half of the season.

Moline beat Davenport 4 games to 2 for the title.

1916 Illinois–Indiana–Iowa League
The Freeport team folded.  New teams in Hannibal, Missouri and Rock Island, Illinois formed and joined the league.  The playoff system was apparently dropped.

1917 Illinois–Indiana–Iowa League
The Davenport team folded.  A new team in Alton, Illinois formed and joined the league.

1918, The league suspended operations because of World War I.

1919 Illinois–Indiana–Iowa League
The teams in Alton, Hannibal, Quincy, and Rock Island folded.  New teams in Evansville, Indiana and Terre Haute, Indiana formed and joined the league.

1920 Illinois–Indiana–Iowa League
New teams in Cedar Rapids, Iowa and Rock Island, Illinois formed and joined the league. Evansville changed their names to the "Evas".

1921 Illinois–Indiana–Iowa League

1922 Illinois–Indiana–Iowa League
The teams in Cedar Rapids and Rock Island moved to the Mississippi Valley League. New teams in Danville and Decatur formed and joined the league.

1923 Illinois–Indiana–Iowa League

1924 Illinois–Indiana–Iowa League
The Rockford team folded.  The Moline team moved to the Mississippi Valley League.

1925 Illinois–Indiana–Iowa League
New teams in Quincy and Springfield formed and joined the league.

1926 Illinois–Indiana–Iowa League

Springfield played Bay City of the Michigan State League and won 4 games to none.  They were leading against Des Moines of the Western League 3 games to 1 when the series was canceled due to cold weather.

1927 Illinois–Indiana–Iowa League

1928 Illinois–Indiana–Iowa League
The league returned to the playoff format in which the team with the best record in the first half of the season played the team with the best records in the second half of the season for the title.

Decatur beat Terre Haute for the title 4 games to 1, with 1 tie.

1929 Illinois–Indiana–Iowa League
Two teams with the nickname "Tractors" played in the league this season.

Quincy played Canton of the Central League after the season ended and lost 4 games to 2.

1930 Illinois–Indiana–Iowa League
The league returned to the best record in the 1st half vs. best record in the 2nd half playoff system.

Danville defeated Evansville 4 games to 2 for the title.  Danville went on to play Springfield of the Central League and lead 3 games to 2 when the series was cancelled because of poor attendance.

1931 Illinois–Indiana–Iowa League

Quincy beat Springfield 4 games to 2 for the championship.

1932 Illinois–Indiana–Iowa League
The teams in Bloomington and Evansville folded before the season, and the Springfield and Decatur teams folded on July 12.

The Terre Haute, Peoria, Quincy, and Danville teams all folded on July 15, as did the league itself. The league was restarted in 1935, 1937–1942, and 1946–1961.

Year–by–year 1935 to 1949 
1935 Illinois–Indiana–Iowa League
 Playoff: Springfield 4 games, Bloomington 2. Bloomington was declared the winner when Springfield refused to replay protested final game that was upheld by the league president. 
 
1937 Illinois–Indiana–Iowa Leagueschedule
 Bloomington and Terre Haute disbanded July 3, at the end of the first half. Playoff: Moline 4 games, Clinton 2. 
 
1938 Illinois–Indiana–Iowa Leagueschedule
 Playoffs: Decatur 3 games, Springfield 2; Mobile 3 games, Evansville 1. Finals: Decatur 4 games, Moline 1.
 
1939 Illinois–Indiana–Iowa Leagueschedule
 Playoffs: Springfield 3 games, Evansville 1; Decatur 3 games, Cedar Rapids 1. Finals: Springfield 3 games, Decatur 2.
 
1940 Illinois–Indiana–Iowa League
 Playoffs: Cedar Rapids 3 games, Springfield 0; Decatur 3 games, Evansville 2. Finals: Cedar Rapids 3 games, Decatur 1. 
 
1941 Illinois–Indiana–Iowa League schedule
 Playoffs: Decatur 3 games, Evansville 2; Cedar Rapids 3 games, Springfield 1. Finals: Cedar Rapids 3 games, Decatur 2. 
 
1942 Illinois–Indiana–Iowa League
 Playoffs: Cedar Rapids 3 games, Evansville 2; Madison 3 games, Springfield 1. Finals: Cedar Rapids 3 games, Madison 0. 
 
The league did not play in 1943, 1944 and 1945 due to World War II
1946 Illinois–Indiana–Iowa League
 Playoffs: Davenport defeated Danville in a one game playoff for first place; Evansville 3 games, Davenport 1. Terre Haute 3 games, Danville 1. Finals: Evansville 3 games, Terre Haute 0.
 
1947 Illinois–Indiana–Iowa League
 Playoffs: Springfield defeated Waterloo in a playoff for third place; Danville 3 games, Springfield 2; Waterloo 3 games, Terre Haute 0. Finals: Waterloo 4 games, Danville 1. 
 
1948 Illinois–Indiana–Iowa Leagueschedule
 Playoffs: Terre Haute 3 games, Danville 2. Evansville 3 games, Quincy 2. Finals: Evansville 4 games, Terre Haute 0. 
 1949 Illinois–Indiana–Iowa Leagueschedule
 Playoffs: Evansville 3 games, Terre Haute 2; Davenport 3 games, Waterloo 2. Finals: Davenport 3 games, Evansville 0.

Year-by-year 1950 to 1961 
1950 Illinois–Indiana–Iowa League1950 Three-I League schedule 
 Playoffs: Terre Haute 3 games, Quincy 0; Danville 3 games, Waterloo 0. Finals: Terre Haute 3 games, Danville 1. 
 
1951 Illinois–Indiana–Iowa Leagueschedule
 Playoffs: Quincy 3 games, Terre Haute 1; Cedar Rapids 3 games, Evansville 2. Finals: Quincy 3 games, Cedar Rapids 2. 
 
1952 Illinois–Indiana–Iowa League schedule
 Playoffs: Evansville 3 games, Burlington 2; Terre Haute 3 games, Waterloo 0. Finals: Terre Haute 3 games, Evansville 1. 
 
1953 Illinois–Indiana–Iowa Leagueschedule
 Playoffs: Evansville 3 games, Terre Haute 2; Quincy 3 games, Waterloo 1. Finals: Quincy 3 games, Evansville 0. 
 
1954 Illinois–Indiana–Iowa League schedule
 Playoffs: Peoria 3 games, Evansville 1; Quincy 3 games, Keokuk 1. Finals: Quincy 3 games, Peoria 0. 
 
1955 Illinois–Indiana–Iowa League schedule
 Playoffs: Keokuk 3 games, Peoria 0; Burlington 3 games, Waterloo 1. Finals: Keokuk 3 games, Burlington 1. 
 
1956 Illinois–Indiana–Iowa League schedule
Terre Haute disbanded July 3. Playoffs: None Scheduled 

1957 Illinois–Indiana–Iowa Leagueschedule
 Playoffs: None Scheduled 
 
1958 Illinois–Indiana–Iowa League - schedule
Rochester (20—37) moved to Winona June 29. Playoff: Cedar Rapids 3 games, Davenport 2. 
 
1959 Illinois–Indiana–Iowa League schedule
 Playoff: Green Bay 3 games, Des Moines 1. 
 
1960 Illinois–Indiana–Iowa Leagueschedule
 Playoff: None Scheduled 
 
1961 Illinois–Indiana–Iowa Leagueschedule
 Playoff: None Scheduled

Baseball Hall of Fame alumni

Luis Aparicio, 1954 Waterloo White Hawks 
Lou Boudreau, 1938 Cedar Rapids Raiders
Mordecai Brown, 1901 Terre Haute Hottentots; 1919–1920 Terre Haute Browns 
Jim Bunning, 1951 Davenport Tigers 
Red Faber, 1909–1910 Dubuque Dubs 
Warren Giles, 1920–1921 Moline Plowboys 
Hank Greenberg, 1931 Evansville Hubs 
Burleigh Grimes, 1935 Bloomington Bloomers 
Whitey Herzog, 1952 Quincy Gems 
Carl Hubbell, 1927 Decatur Commodores 
Chuck Klein, 1927 Evansville Hubs 
Tony Lazzeri, 1923 Peoria Tractors 
Joe McGinnity, 1922 Danville Veterans 
Red Ruffing, 1923 Danville Veterans 
Warren Spahn, 1941 Evansville Bees 
Earl Weaver, 1960–1961 Fox Cities Foxes 
Billy Williams, 1958 Burlington Bees
also: Milo Hamilton, 1950–1951 Davenport Tigers Announcer, Ford C. Frick Award
Tony Kubek, 1955 Quincy Gems, Ford C. Frick Award 
Bob Uecker, 1957, Evansville Braves, Ford C. Frick Award

Three-I Most Valuable Players

1961 Tommy Harper, Topeka Reds
1960 Pete Ward, Fox Cities Foxes
1959 Cal Emery	Des Moines Demons 
1958 Frank Howard, Green Bay Bluejays
1957 Don Nichols, Peoria Chiefs
1956 Don Nottebart, Evansville Braves 
1955 Johnny Romano, Waterloo White Hawks

References

External links
Three-I League ballpark photos

1901 establishments in Illinois
1901 establishments in Indiana
1901 establishments in Iowa
1961 disestablishments in the United States
Baseball leagues in Illinois
Baseball leagues in Indiana
Baseball leagues in Iowa
Defunct minor baseball leagues in the United States
Defunct professional sports leagues in the United States
Sports leagues established in 1901
 
Baseball leagues in Wisconsin
Baseball leagues in Missouri
Baseball leagues in Kansas
Baseball leagues in Minnesota
Baseball leagues in Nebraska
Sports leagues disestablished in 1961